Sialkot (Punjabi) is a city located in Punjab, Pakistan. It is the capital of the Sialkot District and is the 13th most populous city in Pakistan. The boundaries of Sialkot are joined with Jammu (the winter capital of Indian administered Jammu and Kashmir) in the north east, the districts of Narowal in the southeast, Gujranwala in the southwest and Gujrat in the northwest. 

Sialkot is believed to be the successor of Sagala, the capital of the Madra kingdom razed by Alexander the Great in 326 BCE, and then made the capital of the Indo-Greek kingdom by Menander I in the 2nd century BCE—a time during which the city greatly prospered as a major center for trade and Buddhist thought. In 6th century, it was again made capital of the Taank Kingdom, which ruled Punjab for the next two centuries. Sialkot continued to be a major political centre until it was eclipsed by Lahore around the turn of the first millennium. The city rose again in prominence during the British era and is now one of Pakistan's most important industrial centers. The city is also the birthplace of Muhammad Iqbal, Pakistan's national poet. 

Sialkot is wealthy relative to other cities in South Asia, with an estimated 2021 per capita income of $18,500(nominal). The city has been noted for its entrepreneurial spirit and productive business climate that has made Sialkot an example of a small Pakistani city that has emerged as a "world-class manufacturing hub." The relatively small city exported approximately $2.5 billion worth of goods in 2017, or about 10% of Pakistan's total exports. 

The city has been labelled as the Football manufacturing capital of the World, as it produces over 70% of footballs manufactured in the world. Sialkot is also home to the Sialkot International Airport; Pakistan's first privately owned public airport. Along with the nearby cities of Gujranwala and Gujrat, Sialkot forms part of the so-called "Golden Triangle" of industrial cities with export-oriented economies. Through exports, Sialkot-based industries are obtaining foreign exchange to more than $2.5 billion annually to strengthen the national exchequer. Sialkot has a GDP(nominal) of $13 Billions, which make it 4th largest in Pakistan.

History

Ancient

Founding

Sialkot is likely the capital of the Madra Kingdom Sagala, Sakala, or Sangala mentioned in the Mahabharata, a Sanskrit epic of ancient India, as occupying a similar area as Greek accounts of Sagala. The city may have been inhabited by the Saka, or Scythians, from Central Asia who had migrated into the Subcontinent. The region was noted in the Mahabharata for the  "loose and Bacchanalian" women who lived in the woods there. The city was said to have been located in the Sakaladvipa region between the Chenab and Ravi rivers, now known as the Rechna Doab.

Greek 
The Anabasis of Alexander, written by the Roman-Greek historian Arrian, recorded that Alexander the Great captured ancient Sialkot, recorded as Sagala, from the Cathaeans, who had entrenched themselves there. The city had been home to 80,000 residents on the eve of Alexander's invasion, but was razed as a warning against any other nearby cities that might resist his invasion.

Indo-Greek 

The ancient city was rebuilt, and made capital by the Indo-Greek king Menander I of the Euthydemid dynasty, in the 2nd century BCE. The rebuilt city was shifted slightly from the older city, as rebuilding on exactly the same spot was considered inauspicious.

Under Menander's rule, the city greatly prospered as a major trading centre renowned for its silk. Menander embraced Buddhism in Sagala, after an extensive debating with the Buddhist monk Nagasena, as recorded in the Buddhist text Milinda Panha. the text offers an early description of the city's cityscape and status as a prosperous trade centre with numerous green spaces. Following his conversion, Sialkot developed as a major centre for Buddhist though.

Ancient Sialkot was recorded by Ptolemy in his 1st century CE work, Geography, in which he refers to the city as Euthymedia (Εύθυμέδεια).

Alchon Huns 
Around 460 CE, the Alchon Huns invaded the region from Central Asia, forcing the ruling family of nearby Taxila to seek refuge in Sialkot. Sialkot itself was soon captured, and the city was made capital of the Alchon Huns around 515, during the reign of Toramana. During the reign of his son, Mihirakula, the empire reached its zenith. The Alchon Huns were defeated in 528 by a coalition of princes led by Prince Yashodharman

Late antiquity 
The city was visited by the Chinese traveller Xuanzang in 633, who recorded the city's name as She-kie-lo. Xuanzang reported that the city had been rebuilt approximately 15 li, or 2.5 miles, away from the city ruined by Alexander the Great. During this time, Sialkot served as the political nucleus of the Punjab region. The city was then invaded in 643 by princes from Jammu, who held the city until the Muslim invasions during the medieval era.

Medieval
Around the year 1000, Sialkot began to decline in importance as the nearby city of Lahore rose to prominence. Following to fall of Lahore to the Ghaznavid Empire in the early 11th century, the capital of the Hindu Shahi empire was shifted from Lahore to Sialkot. Ghaznavid expansion in northern Punjab encouraged local Khokhar tribes to stop paying tribute to the Rajas of Jammu.

Sialkot became a part of the medieval Sultanate of Delhi after Muhammad Ghauri conquered Punjab in 1185. Ghauri was unable to conquer the larger city of Lahore, but deemed Sialkot important enough to warrant a garrison. He also extensively repaired the Sialkot Fort around the time of his conquest of Punjab, and left the region in charge of Hussain Churmali while he returned to Ghazni. Sialkot was then quickly laid siege to by Khokhar tribesmen, and Khusrau Malik, the last Ghaznavid sultan, though he was defeated during Ghauri's return to Punjab in 1186.

In the 1200s, Sialkot was the only area of western Punjab that was ruled by the Mamluk Sultanate in Delhi. The area had been captured by the Ghauri prince Yildiz, but was recaptured by Sultan Iltutmish in 1217. Around 1223, Jalal ad-Din Mingburnu, the last king of the Khwarazmian dynasty of Central Asia that had fled invasion of Genghis Khan there, briefly captured Sialkot and Lahore, before being driven out by Iltutmish's forces towards Uch Sharif. During the 13th century, Imam Ali-ul-Haq, Sialkot's most revered Sufi warrior-saint, arrived from Arabia, and began his missionary work in the region that successfully converted large numbers of Hindus to Islam, thereby transforming Sialkot into a largely Muslim city. The saint later died in battle, and is revered as a martyr.

Sialkot fell to Shaikha Khokhar around 1414. Sialkot's population continued to grow in the 1400s under the rule of Sultan Bahlul Lodi, who had granted custodianship of the city to Jammu's Raja Biram Dev, after he helped Lodhi defeat the Khokhars. Sialkot was sacked during the Lodhi period by Malik Tazi Bhat of Kashmir, who attacked Sialkot after the governor of Punjab, Tatar Khan, had left the city undefended during one of his military campaigns.

Sialkot was captured by armies of the Babur in 1520, when the Mughal commander Usman Ghani Raza advanced towards Delhi during the initial conquest of Babur.  Babur recorded a battle with Gujjar raiders, who had attacked Sialkot, and allegedly mistreated its inhabitants.<ref>{{quote|29th December: We dismounted at Sialkot. If one enters Hindustan the Jats and Gujjars always pour down in countless hordes from hill and plain for loot of bullocks and buffalo. These ill-omened peoples are senseless oppressors. Previously, their deeds did not concern us because the territory was an enemy's. But they did the same senseless deeds after we had captured it. When we reached Sialkot, they swooped on the poor and needy folk who were coming out of the town to our camp and stripped them bare. I had the witless brigands apprehended, and ordered a few of them to be cut to pieces.'Babur Nama page 250 published by Penguin}}</ref> In 1525–1526, Alam Khan, uncle of Sultan Ibrahim Lodi, invaded from Afghanistan, and was able to capture Sialkot with the aid of Mongol forces.

Pre-modern
 Mughal 
During the early Mughal era, Sialkot was made part of the subah, or "province," of Lahore. According to Sikh tradition, Guru Nanak, the founder of Sikhism, visited the city, sometime in the early 16th century. He is said to have met Hamza Ghaus, a prominent Sufi mystic based in Sialkot, at a site now commemorated by the city's Gurdwara Beri Sahib.

During the Akbar era, Sialkot's pargana territory was placed in the jagir custodianship of Raja Man Singh, who would repair the city's fort, and sought to increase its population and develop its economy. In 1580 Yousuf Shah Chak of Kashmir sought refuge in the city during his exile from the Valley of Kashmir. Paper-makers from Kashmir migrated to the city during the Akbar period, and Sialkot later became renowned as the source of the prized Mughal Hariri paper – known for its brilliant whiteness and strength. The city's metalworkers also provided the Mughal crown with much of its weaponry.

During the reign of Jahangir, the post was given to Safdar Khan, who rebuilt the city's fort, and oversaw a further increase in Sialkot's prosperity. Numerous fine houses and gardens were built in the city during the Jehangir period. During the Shah Jahan period, the city was placed under the rule of Ali Mardan Khan.

The last Mughal emperor, Aurangzeb, appointed Ganga Dhar as faujdar  of the city until 1654. Rahmat Khan was then placed in charge of the city, and would build a mosque in the city. Under Aurangzeb's reign, Sialkot became known as a great centre of Islamic thought and scholarship, and attracted scholars because of the widespread availability of paper in the city.

 Post-Mughal 
Following the decline of the Mughal empire after the death of Emperor Aurangzeb in 1707, Sialkot and its outlying districts were left undefended and forced to defend itself. In 1739, the city was captured by Nader Shah of Persia during his invasion of the Mughal Empire. The city was placed under the governorship of Zakariya Khan, the Mughal Viceroy of Lahore, who in return for the city promised to pay tribute to the Persian crown.

In the wake of the Persian invasion, Sialkot fell under the control of Pashtun powerful families from Multan and Afghanistan – the Kakayzais and Sherwanis. Sialkot was crept upon by Ranjit Deo of Jammu, who pledged nominal allegiance to the Mughal crown in Delhi. Ranjit Deo did not conquer Sialkot city from the Pashtun families which held the city, but switched allegiance to the Pashtun ruler Ahmed Shah Durrani in 1748, effectively ending Mughal influence in Sialkot. The city and three nearby districts were amalgamated into the Durrani Empire.

 Sikh 
Sikh chieftains of the Bhangi Misl state encroached upon Sialkot, and had gained full control of the Sialkot region by 1786, Sialkot was portioned into 4 quarters, under the control of Sardar Jiwan Singh, Natha Singh, Sahib Singh, and Mohar Singh, who invited the city's dispersed residents back to the city.

The Bhangi rulers engaged in feuds with the neighbouring Sukerchakia Misl state by 1791, and would eventually lose control of the city. The Sikh Empire of Ranjit Singh captured Sialkot from Sardar Jiwan Singh in 1808. Sikh forces then occupied Sialkot until the arrival of the British in 1849.

 Modern 
British

Sialkot, along with Punjab as a whole, was captured by the British following their victory over the Sikhs at the Battle of Gujrat in February 1849. During the British era, an official is known as The Resident who would, in theory, advise the Maharaja of Kashmir would reside in Sialkot during the wintertime.

During the Sepoy Mutiny of 1857, the two Bengal regiments based in Sialkot rebelled against the East India Company, while their native servants also took up arms against the British. In 1877, the Sialkot poet Allama Iqbal, who is credited for inspiring the Pakistan Movement, was born into a Kashmiri family that had converted to Islam from Hinduism in the early 1400s. British India's first bagpipe works opened in Sialkot, and today there are 20 pipe bands in the city.

Sialkot's modern prosperity began during the colonial era. The city had been known for its paper making and ironworks prior to the colonial era, and became a centre of metalwork in the 1890s. Surgical instruments were being manufactured in Sialkot for use throughout British India by the 1920s. The city also became a centre for sports goods manufacturing for British troops stationed along with the North West Frontier due to the availability of nearby timber reserves.

As a result of the city's prosperity, large numbers of migrants from Jammu region of  Jammu and Kashmir came to the city in search of employment. At the end of World War II, the city was considered the second most industrialised in Punjab, after Amritsar. Much of the city's infrastructure was paid for by local taxes, and the city was one of the few in British India to have its own electric utility company.

Partition
The first communal riots between Hindus/Sikhs and Muslims took place on 24 June 1946, a day after the resolution calling for the establishment of Pakistan as a separate state. Sialkot remained peaceful for several months while communal riots had erupted in Lahore, Amritsar, Ludhiana, and Rawalpindi. The predominantly Muslim population supported Muslim League and the Pakistan Movement.

While Muslim refugees had poured into the city escaping riots elsewhere, Sialkot's Hindu and Sikh communities began fleeing in the opposite direction towards India. They initially congregated in fields outside the city, where some of Sialkot's Muslims would bid farewell to departing friends. Hindu and Sikh refugees were unable to exit Pakistan towards Jammu on account of conflict in Kashmir, and were instead required to transit via Lahore.

Post-independence
After independence in 1947 the Hindu and Sikh minorities migrated to India, while Muslim refugees from India settled in Sialkot. The city had suffered significant losses as a result of communal rioting that erupted because of Partition. 80% of Sialkot's industry had been destroyed or abandoned, and the working capital fell by an estimated 90%. The city was further stressed by the arrival of 200,000 migrants, mostly from Jammu, who had arrived in the city.

Following the demise of industry in the city, the government of West Pakistan prioritised the re-establishment of Punjab's decimated industrial base. The province lead infrastructure projects in the area, and allotted abandoned properties to newly arrived refugees. Local entrepreneurs also rose to fill the vacuum created by the departure of Hindu and Sikh businessmen. By the 1960s, the provincial government laid extensive new roadways in the district, and connected it to trunk roads to link the region to the seaport in Karachi.

During the Indo-Pakistani War of 1965, when Pakistani troops arrived in Kashmir, the Indian Army counterattacked in the Sialkot Sector. The Pakistan Army successfully defended the city and the people of Sialkot came out in full force to support the troops. In 1966, Government of Pakistan awarded a special flag of Hilal-e-Istaqlal to Sialkot, along with Lahore and Sargodha in Indo-Pakistani War of 1965]for showing severe resistance in front of enemy as these cities were target of enemy's advances. Every year on Defence Day, this flag is hoisted in these cities as a symbol of recognition of the will, courage and perseverance of the dwellers of these cities. The armoured battles in the Sialkot sector like the Battle of Chawinda were the most intense since the Second World War.

Geography
Climate
Sialkot features a humid subtropical climate (Cwa) under the Köppen climate classification, with four seasons. The post-monsoon season from mid-September to mid-November remains hot during the daytime, but nights are cooler with low humidity. In the winter from mid-November to March, days are mild to warm, with occasionally heavy rainfalls occurring.

Cityscape
Sialkot's core is composed of the densely populated old city, while north of the city lies the vast colonial era Sialkot Cantonment – characterised by wide streets and large lawns. The city's industries have evolved in a "ribbon-like" pattern along the cities main arteries, and are almost entirely dedicated to export. The city's sporting good firms are not concentrated in any part of the city, but are instead spread throughout Sialkot. Despite the city's overall prosperity, the local government has failed to meet Sialkot's basic infrastructure needs.

 Demographics 
 Religion 

 Economy 
Sialkot is a wealthy city relative to the rest of Pakistan, with a GDP (nominal) of $13 Billions and a per capita income in 2021 estimated at $18500. The city was considered to be one of British India's most industralised cities, though its economy would later be largely decimated by violence and capital flight following the Partition. The city's economy rebounded, and Sialkot now forms part of the relatively industriazised region of northern Punjab that is sometimes referred to as the Golden Triangle.Sialkot has been noted by Britain's The Economist magazine as a "world-class manufacturing hub" with strong export industries. As of 2017, Sialkot exported US$2.5 billion worth of goods which is equal to 10% of Pakistan's total exports (US$25 billion). 250,000 residents are employed in Sialkot's industries, with most enterprises in the city being small and funded by family savings. Sialkot's Chamber of Commerce had over 6,500 members in 2010, with most active in the leather, sporting goods, and surgical instruments industry. The Sialkot Dry Port offers local producers quick access to Pakistani Customs, as well as to logistics and transportation. 

Despite being cut off from its historic economic heartland in Kashmir, Sialkot has managed to position itself into one of Pakistan's most prosperous cities, exporting up to 10% of all Pakistani exports. Its sporting goods firms have been particularly successful, and have produced items for global brands such as Nike, Adidas, Reebok, and Puma. Balls for the 2014 FIFA World Cup, 2018 FIFA World Cup and 2022 FIFA World Cup were made by Forward Sports, a Sialkot-based company.

Sialkot's business community has joined with the local government to maintain the city's infrastructure, as the local government has limited capacity to fund such maintenance. The business community was instrumental in the establishment of Sialkot's Dry Port in 1985, and further helped re-pave the city's roads. Sialkot's business community also largely funded the Sialkot International Airport—opened in 2011 as Pakistan's first privately owned public airport.

Sialkot is also the only city in Pakistan to have its very own commercial airline, Airsial. This airline is managed by the business community of Sialkot based at the Sialkot Chamber of Commerce and Industries and offers  direct flights from Sialkot to Bahrain, Oman, Qatar, Saudi Arabia, and the United Arab Emirates.

 Industry 

Sialkot is the world's largest producer of hand-sewn footballs, with local factories manufacturing 40–60 million footballs a year, amounting to roughly 60% of world production. Since the 2014 FIFA World Cup, footballs for the official matches are being made by Forward Sports, a company based in Sialkot. Clustering of sports goods industrial units has allowed for firms in Sialkot to become highly specialised, and to benefit from joint action and external economies. There is a well-applied child labour ban, the Atlanta Agreement, in the industry since a 1997 outcry, and the local industry now funds the Independent Monitoring Association for Child Labour to regulate factories.

Sialkot is also the world's largest centre of surgical instrument manufacturing. Sialkot was first noted to be a centre of metalwork in the 1890s, and the city's association with surgical instruments came from the need to repair, and subsequently manufacture, surgical instruments for the nearby Mission hospital. By the 1920s, surgical instruments were being manufactured for use throughout British India, with demand boosted by further by World War II.

The city's surgical instrument manufacturing industry benefits from a clustering effect, in which larger manufacturers remain in close contact with smaller and specialised industries that can efficiently perform contracted work. The industry is made up of a few hundred small and medium size enterprises, supported by thousands of subcontractors, suppliers, and those providing other ancillary services. The bulk of exports are destined for the United States and European Union.

Sialkot first became a centre for sporting goods manufacturing during the colonial era. Enterprises were initially inaugurated for the recreation of British troops stationed along the North West Frontier. Nearby timber reserves served to initially allure the industry to Sialkot. The city's Muslim craftsmen generally manufactured the goods, while Sikh and Hindu merchants of the Sindhi Bania, Arora, and Punjabi Khatri castes acted like middle men to bring goods to market. Sialkot now produces a wide array of sporting goods, including footballs and hockey sticks, cricket gear, gloves that are used in international games comprising the Olympics and World Cups.

Sialkot is also noted for its leather goods. Leather for footballs is sourced from nearby farms, while Sialkot's leather workers craft some of Germany's most prized leather lederhosen'' trousers. 

Sialkot also has a large share in the agricultural sector. It predominantly produces Basmati rice varieties, wheat and sugarcane. Potato and sunflower were evident among the minor crops of the district.

Public-Private Partnerships 
Sialkot has a productive relationship between the civic administration and the city's entrepreneurs, that dates to the colonial era. Sialkot's infrastructure was paid for by local taxes on industry, and the city was one of the few in British Raj to have its own electric utility company.

Modern Sialkot's business community has assumed responsibility for developing infrastructure when the civic administration is unable to deliver requested services. The city's Chamber of Commerce established the Sialkot Dry Port, the country's first dry-port in 1985 to reduce transit times by offering faster customs services. Members of the Chamber of Commerce allowed paid fees to help resurface the city's streets. The Sialkot International Airport was established by the local businesses community, is the only private airport in Pakistan.

Transportation

Highways 
A dual-carriageway connects Sialkot to the nearby city of Wazirabad, with onward connections throughout Pakistan via the N-5 National Highway, while another dual carriageway connects Sialkot to Daska, and onwards to Gujranwala and Lahore. Sialkot and Lahore are also connected through the motorway M11.

Rail 
The Sialkot Junction railway station is the city's main railway station and is serviced by the Wazirabad–Narowal Branch Line of the Pakistan Railways. The Allama Iqbal Express travels daily from Sialkot to Karachi via Lahore, and then back to Sialkot.

Air 

The Sialkot International Airport is located about 20 km from the center of the city near Sambrial. It was established in 2007 by spending 4 billion rupees by Sialkot business community. It is Pakistan's only privately owned public airport, and offers flights throughout Pakistan, with also direct flights to Bahrain, Oman, Saudi Arabia, Qatar, the United Arab Emirates, France, the UK and Spain.

Notable people

 Abdul Hakim Sialkoti, Islamic scholar
 Muhammad Iqbal, poet 
 Gulzarilal Nanda, Indian Prime Minister and politician
 Muhammad Ibrahim Mir Sialkoti, Islamic scholar
 Faiz Ahmed Faiz, poet
 Faiz-ul Hassan Shah, Islamic religious scholar, orator, poet and writer
 Akhtar Ali Vario, Politician
 Rajendra Kumar, actor
 Usman Dar, politician
 Zaheer Abbas, cricketer
 Shahnaz Sheikh, hockey player
 Shoaib Malik, cricketer
 Haris Sohail, cricketer
 Khawaja Asif, politician
 Firdous Ashiq Awan, politician
 Armghan Subhani,politician

Awards
In 1966, the Government of Pakistan awarded a special flag, the Hilal-i-istaqlal to Sialkot (also to Sargodha and Lahore) for showing severe resistance to the enemy during the Indo-Pakistani War of 1965 as these cities were targets of the Indian aggression. Every year on Defence Day (6 September), this flag is hoisted in these cities in recognition of the will, courage and perseverance of their people.

Twin towns – sister cities

Sialkot is twinned with:
 Bolingbrook, Illinois, United States

See also
 Sialkot Chamber of Commerce and Industry
 List of educational institutions in Sialkot
 List of cities in Punjab, Pakistan by area
 Sialkot Stallions
 Shivala Teja Singh temple

Notes

References

External links

 Sialkot District Government website
 Sialkot Chamber of Commerce & Industry

 
Jat princely states
Indo-Pakistani War of 1965
Cities and towns in Sialkot District
Cities in Punjab (Pakistan)
Populated places in Punjab, Pakistan